Semerikovka is a rural locality (a village) in Sikiyazsky Selsoviet, Duvansky District, Bashkortostan, Russia. The population was 88 as of 2010. There are 2 streets.

Population 

 2002: 96
 2010: 88

Location 
Semerikovka is located on the left bank of the Ai river. It is located 7 km from Mesyagutovo, 68 km from Sikiyaz, and 82 km from Suleia.

References 

Rural localities in Duvansky District